The following is a list of chairmen of A.C. Milan.

History 
In more than 120 years of history, 23 presidents have taken turns at the helm of Milan. The first president of the club was Alfred Edwards, who was also one of the club's founding members.

The longest-serving president in the history of Milan is Silvio Berlusconi, who took office in 1986 and held the position until 2004, when he resigned following the approval of a law governing conflicts of interest. He was then president for another two years, from 2006 to 2008, when he left office for the same reason, after becoming Italian Prime Minister, and honorary president from 2012 to 2017, when, after 31 years of management, he sold the club. The most victorious presidency in the history of the club is linked to the management of Berlusconi, with 26 trophies won, which rise to 29 when considering the period in which the office was vacant, for the reasons mentioned above, but during which Berlusconi maintained the ownership of the club.

Other notable presidents in the history of Milan include: Piero Pirelli, in office for 19 years, from 1909 to 1928, famous for having built the San Siro stadium; Andrea Rizzoli, under whose leadership Milan won 4 league titles and its first European Cup, and who had the Milanello sports center built; Franco Carraro, also winner of a European Cup and the Rossoneri's first Intercontinental Cup.

List of chairmen

<small>Legend:
(cpg.) Vacant office. Commissioner or regent is indicated.

References

Chairmen
List
Statistics
Chairmen